The Arm of Gendarmerie was a gendarmerie force created after the proclamation of independence from the Ottoman Empire of Albania on 28 November 1912.

History

Formation of "Arm of Gendarmerie"
After the declaration of independence of Albania was necessary to create a law enforcement force for maintaining order throughout the territory. The first Albanian government has been tasked with creating the Arms of Gendarmerie Alem Tragjasin, Hysni Toskas, Sali Vranisht and Hajredin Hekalin.

In 1913, three battalions were created and headed by Major Hysen Prishtina in Vlorë, by Captain Ali Tetova in Berat and Major Ismail Haki Tatzati in Elbasan. Later in the year, the battalion of Durrës was established and also an academy for recruiting gendarmes in Tirana. The gendarmerie also set her regular gray-green uniform, red and black collar, hooded jacket and ranks in the front part of the collar.

In March 1914, the Great Powers sent Dutch officers who were in charge of organizing and training the Albanian Armed Forces, which also included the Arm of Gendarmerie and the Albanian Militia.

In March 1914, the Great Powers established the International Commission of Control and sent in Albania some Dutch officers to organize and train the Albanian Armed Forces, which also included Arm of Gendarmerie and Albanian Militia. Part of this mission were Col. William De Veer and Major Lodewijk Thomson and several other experienced soldiers.

After discussions with KNK and the Government of Ismail Qemali, Major Thomson was engaged in the preparation of documents for the organization of the Albanian Gendarmerie and the intensive military training of the newly established. At the beginning, 1000 recruits would be prepared, while in its entirety, the Albanian Gendarmerie was foreseen with 5000 recruits. While General De Veer cooperated more with the KNK and conducted military operations on the front.

By the end of World War I, the formation of the new government on 25 December 1918, gathered many other officers and cadets with the intention to ending the anarchy that ruled across the country after the war. Under the command of Haki Ismail Tatzatit, the Italian organizer Ridolfo and Banush Hamdiu, the Arm of Gendarmerie was reestablished.
Later, Ismail Haki Tatzati was appointed battalion commander in Berat, while in Durrës and Elbasan, respectively Major Kasem Qafëzezi and Major Mustafa Aranitasi.

"Arm of the Royal Gendarmerie"
In 1923 Ahmet Zogu, then Minister of Interior of Albania, hired Colonel Walter Francis Stirling as Minister Counselor, who then was asked to reform the Arm of Gendarmerie according to the British model. In 1925, Colonel Stirling was appointed General Inspector of the Albanian gendarmerie, which at that time had an effective 3,000 forces. The reforms that have taken was not always successful. He left the post of Counselor in 1926 but continued to stay in Albania until 1931, in the position of "Inspector General" at the Ministry of Internal Affairs. In 1926, Colonel Stirling was replaced by Major General Jocelyn Percy, who tried to reorganize the Albanian gendarmerie in the most useful structures. He stood at the helm of the gendarmerie until a few months before the Italian invasion of Albania in 1939.

In 1928, after parliament's consent to its own dissolution. A new constituent assembly amended the constitution making Albania a kingdom and transforming Ahmet Zogu into Zog I, "King of Albanians".

The Arm of Gendarmerie changed his name in Arm of the Royal Gendarmerie'.

See also 
 List of gendarmeries

References 

Gendarmerie
Military units and formations of Albania
Military units and formations established in 1913
Military units and formations disestablished in 1939